Nako is a department or commune of Poni Province in southern Burkina Faso. Its capital lies at the town of Nako.

Towns and villages

References

Departments of Burkina Faso
Poni Province